The Jeff Lorber Fusion is the debut album by keyboardist Jeff Lorber as leader of his band "The Jeff Lorber Fusion."

Track listing

Personnel 
The Jeff Lorber Fusion
 Jeff Lorber – keyboards, pianos, synthesizers 
 Lester McFarland – electric bass
 Dennis Bradford – drums
 Terry Layne – reeds, flute

Guest Musicians
 Tod Carver – guitars (7, 8)
 Ron Young – percussion (3)
 Bruce Smith – percussion (4, 7, 8)
 Jeff Uusitalo – trombone (5)

Production 
 Jeff Lorber – producer 
 Harry Callow – producer
 Dave Dixon – engineer
 Suzanne Hill – design
 Orval Goodwin – photography

Charts

References

External links
 Jeff Lorber-The Jeff Lorber Fusion at Discogs

1977 debut albums
Jeff Lorber albums
Inner City Records albums